Konawe Islands Regency is a new regency of Southeast Sulawesi, Indonesia, established in 2013 from part of Konawe Regency and consisting of the seven districts comprising Wawonii Island. It covers an area of 705.71 km2, and had a population of 28,944 at the 2010 Census and 37,050 at the 2020 Census; the official estimate as at mid 2022 was 38,383. The administrative centre lies at the town of Langara.

Administration 
Konawe Islands Regency, which is coincident with Wawonii Island, is divided into seven districts (kecamatan), tabulated below with their areas and their populations at the 2010 Census and 2020 Census, together with the official estimates as at mid 2022. The table also includes the locations of the district administrative centres, the number of villages (rural desa and urban kelurahan) in each district, and its post code.

References

Regencies of Southeast Sulawesi